is a Japanese chain store that sells everyday commodities. There are Loft franchise stores in Japan and Thailand.

See also
Tokyu Hands, competitor

External links

  

Retail companies based in Tokyo
Retail companies established in 1996
Sogo & Seibu
Retailing in Thailand